Frederick North, 2nd Earl of Guilford  (13 April 17325 August 1792), better known by his courtesy title Lord North, which he used from 1752 to 1790, was the 12th Prime Minister of Great Britain from 1770 to 1782. He led Great Britain through most of the American War of Independence. He also held a number of other cabinet posts, including Home Secretary and Chancellor of the Exchequer.

North's reputation among historians has varied wildly, with it reaching its lowest point in the late nineteenth century, when he was depicted as a creature of the king and an incompetent who lost the American colonies. In the early twentieth century, a revised view emerged which emphasised his strengths in administering the Treasury, handling the House of Commons, and in defending the Church of England. Historian Herbert Butterfield, however, argued that his indolence was a barrier to efficient crisis management; he neglected his role in supervising the entire war effort.

Early life
North was born in London on 13 April 1732 at the family house at Albemarle Street, just off Piccadilly. He spent much of his youth at Wroxton Abbey in Oxfordshire. North's strong resemblance to King George III suggested to contemporaries that George III's father, Frederick, Prince of Wales, might have been North's real father, making North the king's half-brother, a theory compatible with the prince's reputation but supported by little else other than the circumstantial evidence. 

King George IV remarked that "either his royal grandfather or North's mother must have played her husband false", North's father, Francis North, 1st Earl of Guilford, was from 1730 to 1751 Lord of the Bedchamber to Frederick, Prince of Wales, who stood as godfather to the infant, christened Frederick, possibly in honor of his real father.

North was descended from Henry Montagu, 1st Earl of Manchester, paternal uncle of Edward Montagu, 1st Earl of Sandwich and was related to Samuel Pepys and the 3rd Earl of Bute. He at times had a slightly turbulent relationship with his father Francis North, yet they were very close. In his early years, the family was not wealthy, though their situation improved in 1735 when his father inherited property from his cousin. Frederick's mother, Lady Lucy Montagu, a daughter of George Montagu, 1st Earl of Halifax and his first wife, Ricarda Posthuma Staltonstall, died in 1734. His father remarried, but his stepmother, Elizabeth Kaye, widow of George Legge, Viscount Lewisham, eldest son of William Legge, 1st Earl of Dartmouth and his wife, Lady Anne Finch, third daughter of Heneage Finch, 1st Earl of Aylesford, died in 1745, when Frederick was thirteen. One of his stepbrothers was William Legge, 2nd Earl of Dartmouth, who remained a close friend for life.

He was educated at Eton College between 1742 and 1748 and at Trinity College, Oxford, where in 1750 he was awarded an MA. After leaving Oxford, he travelled in Europe on a Grand Tour with Lord Dartmouth. They stayed in Leipzig for nearly nine months, studying under the constitutional scholar Johann Jacob Mascov. They continued through Austria and Italy, staying in Rome from December 1752 to Easter 1753, then through Switzerland to Paris, returning to England in early 1754.

Early political career
On 15 April 1754, North, then twenty-two, was elected unopposed as the member of parliament for the constituency of Banbury. He served as an MP from 1754 to 1790 and joined the government as a junior Lord of the Treasury on 2 June 1759 during the Pitt–Newcastle ministry (an alliance between the Thomas Pelham-Holles, 1st Duke of Newcastle and William Pitt the Elder). He soon developed a reputation as a good administrator and parliamentarian and was generally liked by his colleagues. Although he initially considered himself a Whig, he did not closely align with any of the Whig factions in Parliament, and it became obvious to many contemporaries that his sympathies were largely Tory.

He was appointed Lieutenant-Colonel of the 1st Somerset Militiaon 23 June 1759 when it was embodied for fulltime service, and commanded it in the West Counrty for Earl Poulett, the colonel, who was also Lord Lieutenant of Somerset. However, North resigned in November 1761 and concentrated on his political career.

In November 1763, he was chosen to speak for the government concerning radical MP John Wilkes. Wilkes had made a savage attack on both the Prime Minister and the king in his newspaper The North Briton, which many thought libellous. North's motion that Wilkes be expelled from the House of Commons passed by 273 votes to 111. Wilkes' expulsion took place in his absence, as he had already fled to France following a duel.

When a government headed by the Whig magnate Charles Watson-Wentworth, Lord Rockingham came to power in 1765, North left his post and served for a time as a backbench MP. He turned down an offer by Rockingham to rejoin the government, not wanting to be associated with the Whig grandees that dominated the Ministry.

He returned to office when Pitt returned to head a second government in 1766. North was appointed Joint Paymaster of the Forces in Pitt's ministry and became a Privy Counsellor. As Pitt was constantly ill, the government was effectively run by the Augustus FitzRoy, 3rd Duke of Grafton, with North as one of its most senior members.

Chancellor of the Exchequer
In December 1767, he succeeded Charles Townshend as Chancellor of the Exchequer. With the resignation of the secretary of state Henry Seymour Conway in early 1768, North became Leader of the Commons as well. He continued to serve when Pitt was succeeded by Grafton in October.

Prime Minister

Appointment
When the Duke of Grafton resigned as Prime Minister, North formed a government on 28 January 1770. His ministers and supporters tended to be known as Tories, though they were not a formal grouping and many had previously been Whigs. He took over with Great Britain in a triumphant state following the Seven Years' War, which had seen the First British Empire expand to a peak by taking in vast new territories on several continents. Circumstances forced him to keep many members of the previous cabinet in their jobs, despite their lack of agreement with him. In contrast to many of his predecessors, North enjoyed a good relationship with George III, partly based on their shared patriotism and desire for decency in their private lives.

Falklands Crisis

North's ministry had an early success during the Falklands Crisis in 1770, in which Great Britain faced down a Spanish attempt to seize the Falkland Islands, nearly provoking a war. Both France and Spain had been left unhappy by Great Britain's perceived dominance following the British victory in the Seven Years War. Spanish forces seized the British settlement on the Falklands and expelled the small British garrison. When Britain opposed the seizure, Spain sought backing from her ally France. King Louis XV of France did not believe his country was ready for war, however, and in the face of a strong mobilisation of the British fleet, the French compelled the Spanish to back down. Louis also dismissed the Duc de Choiseul, the hawkish Chief Minister of France, who had advocated war and a large invasion of Great Britain by the French.

The British government's prestige and popularity were enormously boosted by the incident. It had successfully managed to drive a wedge between France and Spain and demonstrated the power of the Royal Navy, although it was suggested by critics that this gave Lord North a degree of complacency and an incorrect belief that the European powers would not interfere in British colonial affairs. This was contrasted with the previous administration's failure to prevent France from annexing the Republic of Corsica, a British ally, during the Corsican Crisis two years earlier. Using his newly found popularity, North took a chance and appointed Lord Sandwich to the cabinet as First Lord of the Admiralty.

American War of Independence

Most of North's government was focused first on the growing problems with the American colonies. Later on, it was preoccupied with conducting the American War of Independence that broke out in 1775 with the Battle of Lexington. Following the Boston Tea Party in 1773, Lord North proposed a number of legislative measures that were supposed to punish the Bostonians. These measures were known as the Coercive Acts in Great Britain, while dubbed the Intolerable Acts in the colonies. By shutting down the Boston government and cutting off trade, he hoped they would keep the peace and dispirit the rebellious colonists. Instead, the acts further inflamed Massachusetts and the other colonies, eventually resulting in open war during the Boston campaign of 1775–76.

North deferred the overall strategy of the war to his key subordinates Lord George Germain and the Earl of Sandwich. Despite a series of victories and the capture of New York and Philadelphia, the British were unable to secure a decisive victory. In 1778, the French allied themselves with the American rebels, and Spain joined the war in 1779 as an ally of France, followed by the Dutch Republic in 1780. The British found themselves fighting a global war on four continents without a single ally. After 1778, the British switched the focus of their efforts to the defence of the West Indies, as their sugar wealth made them much more valuable to Great Britain than the Thirteen Colonies. In 1779, Great Britain was faced with the prospect of a major Franco-Spanish invasion, but the Armada of 1779 was ultimately a failure. Several peace initiatives fell through, and an attempt by Richard Cumberland to negotiate a separate peace with Spain ended in frustration.

The country's problems were augmented by the First League of Armed Neutrality, which was formed to counter the British blockade strategy, and threatened British naval supplies from the Baltic. With severe manpower shortages, North's government passed an act abandoning previous statutes placing restrictions on Catholics serving in the military. This provoked an upsurge of anti-Catholic feelings and the formation of the Protestant Association that led to the Gordon Riots in London in June 1780. For around a week, the city was in the control of the mob until the military was called out and martial law imposed. Public opinion, especially in middle-class and elite circles, repudiated anti-Catholicism and violence, and rallied behind the North government. Demands were made for a London police force.

Britain's fortunes in the war in America had temporarily improved following the failure of a Franco-American attack on Newport and the prosecution of a Southern strategy that saw the capture of Charleston, South Carolina and its garrison. During 1780 and 1781, the North government gained strength in the House of Commons.

In October 1781, British forces under Lord Cornwallis surrendered at the conclusion of the Siege of Yorktown, dealing a crushing blow to British morale. When the news reached North, he took it "as he would have taken a ball in his breast", and exclaimed repeatedly "Oh God! It is all over!"

Resignation

North was the second British Prime Minister to be forced out of office by a motion of no confidence; the first was Sir Robert Walpole in 1742. Lord North resigned on 20 March 1782 on account of the British defeat at Yorktown the year before. In an attempt to end the war, he proposed the Conciliation Plan, in which he promised that Great Britain would eliminate all disagreeable acts if the colonies ended the war. The colonies rejected the plan, as their goal had become full independence.

In April 1782, it was suggested in cabinet by Lord Shelburne that North should be brought to public trial for his conduct of the American War, but the prospect was soon abandoned. Ironically, the war began to turn in Great Britain's favour again in 1782 through naval victories, owing largely to policies adopted by Lord North and the Earl of Sandwich. The British naval victory at the Battle of the Saintes took place after the government's fall. Despite predictions that Gibraltar's fall was imminent, that fortress managed to hold out and was relieved. Great Britain was able to make a much more favourable peace in 1783 than had appeared likely at the time when North had been ousted. In spite of this, North was critical of the terms agreed by the Shelburne government which he felt undervalued the strength of the British negotiating position.

Fox–North coalition 

In April 1783, North returned to power as Home Secretary in an unlikely coalition with the radical Whig leader Charles James Fox known as the Fox–North Coalition under the nominal leadership of the Duke of Portland. King George III, who detested the radical and republican Fox, never forgave this supposed betrayal, and North never again served in government after the ministry fell in December 1783. One of the major achievements of the coalition was the signing of the Treaty of Paris, which formally ended the American War of Independence.

The new Prime Minister, William Pitt the Younger, was not expected to last long, and North, a vocal critic, still entertained hopes of regaining high office. In this, he was to be frustrated, as Pitt dominated the British political scene for the next twenty years, leaving both North and Fox in the political wilderness.

Later life
North was an active speaker until he began to go blind in 1786. He succeeded his father as 2nd Earl of Guilford on 4 August 1790 and entered the House of Lords, by which time he had entirely lost his sight. Lord Guilford died in Mayfair, England (now part of London), and was buried at All Saints' Church, Wroxton (Oxfordshire), near his family home of Wroxton Abbey. His memorial was sculpted by John Flaxman RA.

His son George North, Lord North, took over the constituency of Banbury, and in 1792 acceded to his father's title. Wroxton Abbey is now owned by Fairleigh Dickinson University, ironically an American college, and the modernised abbey serves as a location for American students to study abroad in England.

Legacy
Lord North is today predominantly remembered as the Prime Minister "who lost America".

Both Lord North Street and Guilford Street in London are named after him.

Family

On 20 May 1756 Lord North married Anne Speke (before 17411797), daughter of George Speke MP, of Whitelackington in Somerset. She was the sole heiress of the Devonshire estates of the Drake family of Ash, which subsequently were sold piecemeal by Lord North. By Anne he had seven children:
 George Augustus North, 3rd Earl of Guilford (11 September 175720 April 1802), who married, firstly, Maria Frances Mary Hobart-Hampden (died 23 April 1794), daughter of the 3rd Earl of Buckinghamshire, on 30 September 1785 and had issue. He married, secondly, Susan Coutts (died 24 September 1837), on 28 February 1796.
 Catherine Anne North (1760–1817), who married Sylvester Douglas, 1st Baron Glenbervie, and had no children.
 Francis North, 4th Earl of Guilford (1761–1817)
 Lady Charlotte North (died 25 October 1849), who married Lt. Col. The Hon. John Lindsay (15 March 17626 March 1826), son of the 5th Earl of Balcarres, on 2 April 1800.
 Frederick North, 5th Earl of Guilford (1766–1827)
 Lady Anne North (before 178318 January 1832), who married the 1st Earl of Sheffield on 20 January 1798 and had two children

Titles, styles and arms
The Honourable Frederick North (1732–1752)
Lord North (1752–1790)
The Earl of Guilford (1790–1792)

References

Citations

Sources 

 Aston, Nigel. "North, Frederick, 2nd Earl of Guilford" in David Loads, ed., Readers Guide to British History(2003) pp 960–62; Historiography
 Butterfield, Herbert. George III, Lord North, and the People, 1779–80 (1949)
 Cannon, John. Lord North: The Noble Lord in the Blue Ribbon (1970), Short survey
 Hibbert, Christopher. King Mob: The Story of Lord George Gordon and the Riots of 1780 London, 1958.
 W.J.W. Kerr, Records of the 1st Somerset Militia (3rd Bn. Somerset L.I.), Aldershot:Gale & Polden, 1930. 
 Rodger, N.A.M. Command of the Ocean: A Naval History of Britain 1649–1815, (2007)
 O'Shaughnessy, Andrew Jackson. The Men who Lost America: British Leadership, the American Revolution, and the Fate of the Empire (Yale UP, 2014) pp 47-80. online

 Smith, Charles Daniel. The Early Career of Lord North, the Prime Minister, (1979)
 Valentine, Alan. Lord North (1967, 2 vol.), the standard biography
 Whiteley, Peter. Lord North: The Prime Minister who lost America,'' (1996)

 Primary sources 

 Lord North, The Correspondence of King George the Third with Lord North from 1768 to 1783'', William Bodham Donne, ed. (1867) online edition

External links 

 More about Lord North on the Downing Street website.

1732 births
1792 deaths
18th-century heads of government
18th-century English nobility
Alumni of Trinity College, Oxford
English blind people
British MPs 1754–1761
British MPs 1761–1768
British MPs 1768–1774
British MPs 1774–1780
British MPs 1780–1784
British MPs 1784–1790
British officials in the American Revolution
British Secretaries of State
Chancellors of the Exchequer of Great Britain
Chancellors of the University of Oxford
Guildford, Frederick North, 1st Earl of
Knights of the Garter
Leaders of the House of Commons of Great Britain
Lord-Lieutenants of Somerset
Somerset Militia officers
Lords Warden of the Cinque Ports
Members of the Parliament of Great Britain for English constituencies
Members of the Privy Council of Great Britain
People educated at Eton College
Paymasters of the Forces
Prime Ministers of Great Britain
Frederick
Barons Guilford
Barons North